Yangping is a town in Quyang County, Hebei, China. It is located in the south of the county,  from the county seat. In 1961 it was formed as a commune, and in 1985, the commune was abolished and turned into a township (Yangping Township; 羊平乡). Finally, in 1991, it was renamed as a town and remains so today. The primary industries in the area are engraving and plate processing, while the main agricultural products are wheat and corn.

Administrative divisions
There are 13 villages in the town: South Guzhang, North Guzhang, South West Yangping, Central West Yangping, North West Yangping, East Yangping, Xiguo, Tunzhuang, Anxia, South Yangma, North Yangma, Tianzhuang, Yuantan

See also 
 List of township-level divisions of Hebei

References 

Township-level divisions of Hebei
Geography of Baoding